Gymnohydnotrya is a genus of ascomycete fungi related to the false morels of the genus Gyromitra.

References

Discinaceae
Fungi of Australia
Pezizales genera